Engraved in Black is the fourth studio album by the symphonic black metal band Graveworm, released in 2003 through Nuclear Blast. This is the first Graveworm album to feature guitarist Eric Righi, who also played bass on this recording.

Track listing
"Dreaming Into Reality" – 7:03
"Legions Unleashed"' – 5:29
"Renaissance in Blood" – 3:42
"Thorns of Desolation" – 4:10
"Abhorrence" – 4:50
"Losing My Religion (R.E.M. cover)" (Only on American versions) - 4:24
"Drowned in Fear" – 4:49
"Beauty of Malice" – 5:25
"Apparition of Sorrow" – 2:04

The digipack version contains the following bonus track:
"It's a Sin" (Pet Shop Boys cover) - 3:42

The Japanese version contains the following two bonus tracks:
"It's a Sin" (Pet Shop Boys cover) - 3:42
"Christian Woman" (Type O Negative cover) - 5:34

Credits
Stefan Fiori - Vocals
Stefan Unterpertinger - Guitar
Eric Righi - Guitar & Bass
Sabine Mair - Keyboard
Martin Innerbichler - Drums

References

2003 albums
Graveworm albums
Albums with cover art by Kristian Wåhlin
Nuclear Blast albums
Albums produced by Andy Classen